SS John R. McQuigg was a Liberty ship built in the United States during World War II. She was named after John R. McQuigg, the National Commander of the American Legion, 1925–1926.

Construction
John R. McQuigg was laid down on 14 June 1944, under a Maritime Commission (MARCOM) contract, MC hull 2311, by J.A. Jones Construction, Panama City, Florida; she was sponsored by Mrs. John R. McQuigg, the widow of the namesake, and launched on 19 July 1944.

History
She was allocated to the American South African Lines, Inc., on 31 July 1944. On 1 June 1946, she was laid up in the National Defense Reserve Fleet, in the Hudson River Group. On 16 December 1946, she was transferred to the Italian Government, which in turn sold her to the Italian Commission, for $555,667.40, on 27 December 1946. She was renamed Villa Di Brugine.  In 1968, she was scrapped.

References

Bibliography

 
 
 
 

 

Liberty ships
Ships built in Panama City, Florida
1944 ships
Hudson River Reserve Fleet
Liberty ships transferred to Italy